László Seregi (1929 – 11 May 2012) was a Hungarian dancer and choreographer who served as the primary choreographer of the National Opera of Budapest.

Born in Budapest, László Seregi  originally wished to become a designer. In 1949, however, he changed directions and pursued a career in dance. He studied traditional dance with Iván Szabó and classical dance with Marcella Nádasi.

As a character dancer for the opera of Budapest, where he began performing 1957, Seregi advanced in the company to eventually become a master of ballet in 1967. He then became the ballet director from 1977 to 1984. He was responsible for the opera's folk dances in the 1950s, and then for Opera performances in the 1960s, including Gounod's Faust, Wagner's Tannhaüser. In 1968, he choreographed "Spartacus'", his first ballet in three acts with the Soviet Armenian composer Aram Khachaturian.

His work has been widely recognized in Hungary and abroad, having performed and presented performances in theaters and Opera houses in Moscow, Rome, Prague, Bordeaux, Edinburgh, Cologne, Saint Petersburg, Kyiv, Berlin, Monte Carlo, Vienna, Salzburg, Paris, Turin, London, Zurich and Sydney.

László Seregi died on May 11, 2012 in Budapest at the age of 83.

References

1929 births
2012 deaths
Hungarian male dancers
Hungarian choreographers